St Michael and All Angels’ Church, Church Broughton is a Grade I listed parish church in the Church of England in Church Broughton, Derbyshire.

History

The church dates from the early 12th century but contains elements from the 14th, 15th and early 18th century.

It was restored in 1886 by J.R. Naylor of Derby and re-opened by the Bishop of Southwell on 22 June 1886.

Organ

The two manual, 17 stop pipe organ was installed by Nicholson and Lord. A specification of the organ can be found on the National Pipe Organ Register.

Parish status

The church is in a joint parish with 
St John the Baptist's Church, Boylestone
All Saints' Church, Dalbury
St Chad's Church, Longford
Christ Church, Long Lane
St Andrew's Church, Radbourne
St Michael's Church, Sutton-on-the-Hill
All Saints’ Church, Trusley

See also
Grade I listed buildings in Derbyshire
Grade I listed churches in Derbyshire
Listed buildings in Church Broughton

References

Church of England church buildings in Derbyshire
Grade I listed churches in Derbyshire